Kapur Singh Ghuman was a Punjabi writer and theatre actor born in a Jat Sikh family. He was awarded a Sahitya Academy Award in 1984 for his Punjabi play Pagal Lok. He was director of the Punjab Languages Department. He was born in 1927 and died in a car accident in 1986.

Dramas 

Jeeundi Laash , 1962
Zindaghi Ton Door , 1966
Putalighar , 1966
Pardean De aar Par, 1967
Atita De Parchavem , 1967
Jhungalmata , 1967
Anahoni, 1968
Manas Ki Ek Jaat, 1969
Kach De Gajare, 1969
Wismadu Naad, 1969
Zaildar , 1972
Mook Sansar, 1973
Man Antar Ki Pira, 1975
Bujharat
Azadi Da Suphana
Rani Kokilan, 1979
Pagal Lok , 1982
Roda Jalali , 1982
Santaap, 1983
Noorjahan

External links 
 List of Sahitya Akademi Award winners for Punjabi

Punjabi-language writers
1927 births
1986 deaths
Recipients of the Sahitya Akademi Award in Punjabi